Rolf Weih (1906–1969) was a German film actor.

Selected filmography
 Flachsmann the Educator (1930)
 Comrades at Sea (1938)
 Alarm at Station III (1939)
 In the Name of the People (1939)
 The Governor (1939)
 Alarm (1941)
 We Make Music (1942)
 Rembrandt (1942)
 Doctor Crippen (1942)
 My Wife Theresa (1942)
 Love Premiere (1943)
 The Golden Spider (1943)
 A Man for My Wife (1943)
 The Blue Swords (1949)
 Friday the Thirteenth (1949)
 The Murder Trial of Doctor Jordan (1949)
 Dark Eyes (1951)
 Torreani (1951)
 Not Without Gisela (1951)
 The Heath Is Green (1951)
 Fight of the Tertia (1952)
 The Chaste Libertine (1952)
 The Empress of China (1953)
 Such a Charade (1953)
 Dutch Girl (1953)
 Heroism after Hours (1955)
 Swelling Melodies (1955)
 Through the Forests and Through the Trees (1956)
 The Tour Guide of Lisbon (1956)
 The Model Husband (1956)
 Every Day Isn't Sunday (1959)
 Freddy and the Melody of the Night (1960)
 The Time Has Come (1960, TV series)

Bibliography
 Fox, Jo. Film propaganda in Britain and Nazi Germany: World War II Cinema. Berg, 2007.

External links

German male film actors
German male television actors
Actors from Wuppertal
1906 births
1969 deaths
20th-century German male actors